New Hope was a town in eastern Dallas County (not to be confused with the town of New Hope, Texas in Collin County) that was later incorporated into Sunnyvale, Texas. 

New Hope was founded in the 19th century.  Eventually it became quite large and was the main rival of neighboring Mesquite.  In addition to a significant population the town had a newspaper called the New Hope News, a post office, a school, a baseball club, several stores, and an annual fair called Gala Days. New Hope was a bustling town until 1921, when a storm blew much of it away.  After that and for the length of its remaining history, it remained stagnant and never had the same glory as it did before the storm.

In the year 1953, the towns of New Hope, Long Creek, and Hattersville joined to create one town, Sunnyvale. In Sunnyvale today, some remainders of New Hope are still standing: several old houses, some which are used as households today; the old New Hope schoolhouse; Kearney's Store, which sits on the site of the old Lander's mercantile store where Gala Days used to be held.

References

External links 
 

Sunnyvale, Texas